The Avre  is a river in France and a left tributary of the river Eure.

The headwaters are in the Perche forest in Orne. It is 280m above sea level and joins with the Eure near Dreux and forms the border between the Eure and Eure-et-Loir départements.

The Avre flows through the Orne, Eure-et-Loir and Eure départments and historically forms part of the border of Normandy.

References

Rivers of France
Rivers of Centre-Val de Loire
Rivers of Normandy
Rivers of Eure
Rivers of Eure-et-Loir
Rivers of Orne